The Magnolia Hotel was built in 1847 to serve as a lodging establishment.  It is thought to be the oldest surviving hotel on the Mississippi Gulf Coast.  The hotel was added to the National Register of Historic Places in 1973, and was designated a Mississippi Landmark in 1985.

History
The Magnolia Hotel was constructed for John Hahn, who operated a coffeehouse in New Orleans.  Originally, the hotel was a -story, wood-frame building with plastered exterior walls that measured  on each side.  The exterior walls were recessed .  A central hall extended front to back on both floors.  The first floor had paired rooms on either side of the hall; the second floor hall had six rooms on either side.  The hotel was originally located near the beach, facing south, toward the Mississippi Sound.

John Hahn died in 1848, but his wife operated the hotel to accommodate guests from New Orleans, because Biloxi had become a popular resort destination on the Gulf Coast.  After the American Civil War, the hotel became a destination for winter guests from northern states, who were attracted by the mild climate.  The hotel was operated by descendants of John Hahn through World War II, when it closed.

In 1969, Hurricane Camille inflicted considerable damage to the building. The structure was oriented to face east and was restored. Additional restoration was required to repair damage caused by Hurricane Katrina in 2005.

Biloxi Mardi Gras Museum
As of 2013, the building was being used as Biloxi's Mardi Gras Museum.   In addition to displays of memorabilia from carnival celebrations, the museum documents the history of the Magnolia Hotel.

References

External links
 Biloxi Mardi Gras Museum - City of Biloxi
 Historical Marker Database - The Magnolia Hotel

Hotel buildings on the National Register of Historic Places in Mississippi
Buildings and structures in Biloxi, Mississippi
Museums in Harrison County, Mississippi
Hotel buildings completed in 1847
Mississippi Landmarks
1847 establishments in Mississippi
National Register of Historic Places in Harrison County, Mississippi
Mardi Gras